The 2016 Campeonato Baiano is the 112th edition of Bahia's top professional football league. The competition began on 30 January 2016. Bahia are the defending champions having won their 46th title.

Teams

 Bahia
 Bahia de Feira
 Colo Colo
 Feirense
 Flamengo
 Fluminense
 Galícia
 Jacobina
 Jacuipense
 Juazeirense
 Vitória
 Vitória da Conquista

League tables

Group 1

Group 2

Relegation playoffs

Quarterfinals

Semifinals

3rd place playoffs

Finals

Vitória won 2–1 on aggregate.

External links
Soccerway

2016 in Brazilian football leagues
Campeonato Baiano